Alex Blignaut (30 November 1932 in Johannesburg – 15 January 2001 in Honeydew, Johannesburg) was a racing driver and motor racing team owner from South Africa.

Career
Blignaut raced locally in South Africa for many years and made two appearances in the Formula One Rand Grand Prix under the "Team Valencia" banner, in 1963 and 1964, finishing 12th on both occasions. He also entered the 1965 South African Grand Prix, a World Championship event, but withdrew before the meeting took place.

He later turned to team ownership, setting up the "Alex Blignaut Racing Team" and entering cars in the South African Formula One Championship throughout the late 1960s and early 1970s, earning many race wins. Among the drivers who competed for Blignaut were Eddie Keizan and Ian Scheckter. Keizan also drove Blignaut's Tyrrell 004 in the World Championship South African Grands Prix in 1973 and 1974.

Blignaut was later secretary of SAMRaC (South African Motor Racing Club), the club which organised the South African Grand Prix at Kyalami. He died in 2001 after an accident on his farm, when he electrocuted himself while repairing a piece of machinery.

Results

Complete Formula One World Championship results
(key)

Non-Championship Formula One results
(key)

References

South African racing drivers
South African Formula One drivers
Sportspeople from Johannesburg
1932 births
2001 deaths
Accidental deaths by electrocution